Manuel Antonio Santiago Tarín (1811–1849) (also known as Manuel Leal) was a Mexican soldier and a recruiter and participant in the Texas Revolution on the Texian side.

Early life
He was born in San Antonio de Béxar (now San Antonio, Texas, United States). He married María Luisa Cásares by 1846 and had at least two children.

The son of a military officer, Vicente Tarín and his wife, Juana Isidora Leal, he was grandson of rancher Joaquin Leal and great-great-grandson of Juan Leal, first alcalde (mayor) of San Antonio.  Tarín was baptized at the San Antonio de Valero Mission ("the Alamo") two days after his birth.

In 1813, there was much political turmoil in the region. His father, a Spanish officer, joined the invasion forces of the Gutiérrez-Magee Expedition. After the defeat at the battle of Medina, he fled the Spanish repercussions. He went into exile in the Louisiana territory leaving Manuel and his mother in the care of a Catholic priest. Though his father was given a conditional pardon in 1814, he refused it and chose to remain in exile, continuing in the rebellion against the Spanish crown.

By 1830, Manuel Tarín became a soldier in the Second Flying Company of San Carlos de Parras (Álamo de Parras), serving first at the Alamo and then Fort Tenoxtitlán. The Mexican government's failed support of its frontier outposts forced its men and their families to suffer under the harshest of conditions. Tarín deserted twice, but was returned to duty both times.  His unit ultimately returned to San Antonio and the Alamo.

Texas Revolution

Tarín was largely dissatisfied with the Mexican army as was demonstrated when he was apprehended with his own brother, José Vicente and other accomplices after trying to steal guns and ammunition from the Alamo stores.

By 1835, he deserted the Mexican army and enlisted in the Texas army.  On February 22, 1836, Tarin mustered into Juan N. Seguín's company of Tejanos.  Salvador Flores and Manuel Leal recruiting and organizing 41 Tejano volunteers from ranches southwest of San Antonio reinforced the Texan forces on the Salado Creek, in mid October, a few days after Juan Seguin and Plácido Benavides of Victoria had gathered almost 70 men to aid Commander Stephen F. Austin. He fought at the siege of Béxar under the command of Stephen F. Austin.
Although traveling with Seguín to the Battle of San Jacinto, illness prevented him from being in the final fight.

Tarín left the military in July 1837.  For his service as a Corporal with the Texas army, he was awarded several hundred acres in donation land grants and bounty warrants.

He died sometime after 1849.

Tejanos who served under Juan Seguín

References

External links
Texas State Historical Association's page on Tarin

1811 births
1849 deaths
Texas Isleño people
People from San Antonio
Mexican soldiers
People of Spanish Texas
People of the Texas Revolution